Will Crothers (born June 14, 1987 in Kingston, Ontario) is a Canadian rower. He started rowing in grade 9 for KCVI, following his brother into the sport. Within just a few years, Will and his rowing partner Rob Gibson were Canadian high school champions in heavyweight pairs. Additionally, Will was named Ontario Male Athlete of the Year in 2005.

He won a silver medal at the 2012 Summer Olympics in the men's eight, just behind the German team, with Andrew Byrnes, Gabriel Bergen, Jeremiah Brown, Douglas Csima, Robert Gibson, Malcolm Howard, Conlin McCabe and Brian Price.

In June 2016, he was officially named to Canada's 2016 Olympic team. The men's rowing 4 finished last in the A-final after making it through their heat and semifinal in good standing.

Crothers competed at the 2020 Summer Olympics.

References

External links
 
 

1987 births
Canadian male rowers
Living people
Medalists at the 2012 Summer Olympics
Olympic medalists in rowing
Olympic rowers of Canada
Olympic silver medalists for Canada
Rowers at the 2012 Summer Olympics
Sportspeople from Kingston, Ontario
Rowers at the 2015 Pan American Games
World Rowing Championships medalists for Canada
Pan American Games gold medalists for Canada
Rowers at the 2016 Summer Olympics
Pan American Games medalists in rowing
Medalists at the 2015 Pan American Games
Rowers at the 2020 Summer Olympics
21st-century Canadian people